Te (Т т; italics: Т т) is a letter of the Cyrillic script. In most cursive writing, lowercase Te looks like the Latin lowercase m.

History
The Cyrillic letter Te was derived from the Greek letter Tau (Τ τ).

In the Cyrillic numeral system, Te has a value of 300.

Form

The capital Cyrillic letter Te (Т т) looks the same as the capital Latin letter T (T t) but, as with most Cyrillic letters, the lowercase form is simply a smaller version of the uppercase.

In italic type and cursive, the lowercase form  looks like the italic form of the lowercase Latin M , except in Bulgarian, Serbian and Macedonian usage where it looks like an inverted lowercase Latin M, with a stroke above to distinguish it from the otherwise identical italic lowercase letter Sha , which is sometimes written with a stroke below. Compare the 5th letter pair in the 4th row with the last letter pair of the chart.

The cursive form of the capital letter Te can also be seen in the chart following the lower case letter.

In some old materials, the lowercase form  has two variants: on the Trebnik of Metropolitan Peter and the Ostrog Bible this letter has a taller variant looks like number 7; on some vernacular Russian publications up to the mid-19th century, this letter have been found as a variant resembling a turned Sha. Both of them were encoded in the Unicode Standard in June 2016 with the release of version 9.0.

Usage
As used in the alphabets of various languages, Te represents the following sounds:
palatalized voiceless alveolar plosive 

The pronunciations shown in the table are the primary ones for each language; for details consult the articles on the languages.

Related letters and other similar characters
Τ τ : Greek letter Tau
T t : Latin letter T
Ҭ ҭ : Cyrillic letter Ҭ
Ԏ ԏ : Cyrillic letter Komi Tje
Ћ ћ : Cyrillic Tshe

Computing codes

See also
Macedonian cursive alphabet

References

External links

Cross symbols